Nicholas Robert Audsley (born 6 February 1982) is an English actor, best known for his portrayal of Peter van Pels in Anne Frank: The Whole Story.

Audsley is the oldest of three siblings. He has a younger brother, Charlie, and a younger sister, India. He attended Eltham College, where he appeared in seven plays.

Acting career
Audsley has appeared in a number of BBC and ITV television series, including The Cazalets, Midsomer Murders ("Murder on St. Malley's Day"), Silent Witness and Foyle's War ("A Lesson in Murder"). He appeared in ABC's Anne Frank: The Whole Story in which he plays the character Peter van Pels. He played Lord Strange in the 2017 series The White Princess and Charles, Duke of Monmouth in the third season of Victoria (2019).

Filmography

Film

Television

References

External links

1982 births
Living people
English male television actors